Koufalia is a municipal unit and a town of the Chalkidona municipality. Koufalia is the seat of the municipality of Chalkidona.  Before the 2011 local government reform it was a municipality.

Administrative division
The municipal unit of Koufalia consists of two communities: 
Koufalia (population 8,139)
Prochoma (population 2,440)
The aforementioned population figures are as of 2011.

Geography
Koufalia is located 35 kilometres North-West of the City of Thessaloniki, and virtually by the Axios river. The community of Koufalia covers an area of 67.591 km2 while the municipal unit covers an area of 106,128 km2.

History
Koufalia is built north of the ancient city of Ichnae (IXNAI). Most of its population originates from the town of Kavakli in Bulgaria. They moved to the area after the 1919 signing of the Treaty of Neuilly between Greece and Bulgaria that forced a population exchange between the two countries. In return the mostly Bulgarian population of the village immigrated to Bulgaria, settling mainly on the Black Sea coast, in the area of Anchialo. The population called the city Koufalovo. There are also Ntopioi and Greek refugees from Asia Minor and Thrace.

Culture
It has a number of cultural organisations, the main one being “Megas Alexandros” (Alexander the Great); it was founded in 1980. It has its own lending library as well as a blood bank for humanitarian purposes. Every year it organises the “River Party” on the banks of the Axios river, from 24–26 July, and religious festivals.

References

Populated places in Thessaloniki (regional unit)